Shannon Sturges is an American actress and acting coach, best known for her role as Reese Burton in The WB primetime soap opera Savannah.

Life and career
Sturges was born in Hollywood, California, and is the daughter of actor 
Solomon Sturges and actress Colette Jackson, and granddaughter of director and screenwriter Preston Sturges. Her mother died on 15 May 1969. She graduated from the University of California, Los Angeles, and later began her career on television and film.

Sturges played Molly Brinker on Days of Our Lives from 1991 to 1992. In 1995, she starred in the ABC drama series Extreme, the series was cancelled after only seven episodes. In 1996, Sturges was cast as the lead in Aaron Spelling primetime soap opera Savannah alongside Jamie Luner. She was listed in People'''s 1996 Most Beautiful People edition. The show was a hit in the first season, but dipped in the ratings in the second season and was cancelled in May 1997.

Sturges later starred in number of made for television movies, like Tornado! (1996), Terror in the Mall (1998), Silent Predators (1999), The Perfect Wife (2001), Maid of Honor (2006), Cradle of Lies (2006), and The Wives He Forgot (2006). She also has made guest appearances on shows such as Walker, Texas Ranger, Charmed, Once and Again, Boomtown, Cold Case, and Nip/Tuck, and well played recurring roles on Passions and Port Charles.  In 2012 she joined the cast of River Ridge as Blythe Jensen.

In 2000s, Sturges become an acting coach. She owns Speiser/Sturges Acting Studio in Los Angeles, California.

Personal life
Sturges is married to motion graphic designer Michael Kelley and they have two sons, Jack Enzo Kelley and Ethan Robert Kelley. The family currently resides in Santa Monica.

Filmography
 Doogie Howser, M.D. as Sandi (1 episode, 1990) Brotherhood of the Gun (1991)  Desire and Hell at Sunset Motel (1991) as Louella Days of Our Lives as Molly Brinker (1991-1992) One Stormy Night (1992) as Molly Brinker Herman's Head as The Waitress (1 episode, 1994) Mr. Write (1994) as RachelWalker, Texas Ranger as Linda Lee Robbins (1 episode, 1994) Vanishing Son (1 episode, 1995) Two Guys Talkin' About Girls (1995) as Cindy Four Prima Donnas (1995) as Kim Sterling Tornado! (1996) as  Samantha 'Sam' CallenSavannah as. Reese Burton (34 episodes, 1996-1997) Life with Roger as Nicole (1 episode, 1997) Convict 762 (1997) as NileTerror in the Mall (1998) as The Dr. Sheri MaratosLove Boat: The Next Wave as Rita (1 episode, 1998) Brimstone as Jocelyn Paige (1 episode, 1999Charmed as Helena Statler (1 episode, 1999) Silent Predators (1999) as Mandy StratfordOnce and Again as Ronnie (2 episodes, 2000-2001) The Perfect Wife (2001) as Leah Tyman/Liza StewardBoomtown as Cherie Hechler (1 episode, 2002) Port Charles as Kate Reynolds (2002-2003) S.W.A.T. (2003) as Mrs. Segerstrom Passions as Sheridan Crane (2005) Maid of Honor (2006) as Nicole HarrisCradle of Lies (2006) as Haley CollinsThe Wives He Forgot (2006) as Gillian MathersCold Case as Melanie Campbell (1 episode, 2006) A Christmas Proposal (2008) as CassidyAmbition to Meaning: Finding Your Life's Purpose (2009) as Quinn Harper Nip/Tuck as Mrs. Brett (1 episode, 2009) River Ridge as Blythe Jensen (2012)The Mentalist'' as Susan Fitzgerald (1 episode, 2014)

References

External links

Living people
Actresses from Hollywood, Los Angeles
People from Santa Monica, California
American Methodists
American television actresses
American film actresses
American soap opera actresses
Year of birth missing (living people)